The House of Kamehameha (Hale O Kamehameha), or the Kamehameha dynasty, was the reigning Royal Family of the Kingdom of Hawaii, beginning with its founding by Kamehameha I in 1795 and ending with the death of Kamehameha V in 1872 and Lunalilo in 1874. The kingdom continued for another 21 years, until its overthrow in 1893 with the fall of the House of Kalakaua.

Origins of the Kamehameha dynasty

Originating lines

The origins of the House of Kamehameha stems from the progenitor, Keōua Kalanikupuapa`ikalaninui who was the sacred father of Kamehameha I and by the royal court of his brother Kalaniʻōpuʻu who later became king and gave his war god Kuka'ilimoku to Kamehameha I and he became the king by conquest, uniting all the Hawaiian islands into one kingdom under his undivided rule.  Kalaniʻōpuʻu's father was Kalaninuiʻīamamao and Keōua's father was Kalanikeʻeaumoku, both were sons of Keaweʻīkekahialiʻiokamoku. They shared a common mother, Kamakaʻīmoku. Both brothers served Alapaʻinui, the ruling King of Hawaiʻi island at the time. Contemporary Hawaiian genealogy notes that Keōua may not have been Kamehameha's biological father, and that Kahekili II might have been the figure's real father. But official genealogies of the chiefs as well as the rulers confirm that Keoua was the true father.  Kamehameha I's mother was Kekuʻiapoiwa II, a granddaughter of Keawe.

The traditional mele chant of Keaka, wife of Alapainui, indicates that Kamehameha I was born in the month of ikuwā (winter) or around November. Alapai had given the child, Kamehameha to his wife Keaka and her sister Hākau to care for after the ruler discovered the boy had lived. Samuel Kamakau, in his newspaper article writes "It was during the time of the warfare among the chiefs of [the island of] Hawaii which followed the death of Keawe, chief over the whole island (Ke-awe-i-kekahi-aliʻi-o-ka-moku) that Kamehameha I was born". However, his general dating has been challenged. Abraham Fornander writes in his publication, "An Account of the Polynesian Race: Its Origins and Migrations": "when Kamehameha died in 1819 he was past eighty years old. His birth would thus fall between 1736 and 1740, probably nearer the former than the latter". "A brief history of the Hawaiian people" By William De Witt Alexander lists the birth date in the Chronological Table of Events of Hawaiian History" as 1736. He would be named Paiea but would take the name Kamehameha, meaning "The lonely one" or "The one who has been set apart".

Kalaniʻōpuʻu, the young Kamehameha's uncle, would raise him after his father's death. Kalaniʻōpuʻu ruled Hawaiʻi as did his grandfather Keawe. He had a number of advisors and priests. When word reached the ruler that chiefs were planning to murder the boy, he told Kamehameha:

Cook's arrival and death

In 1778 Captain James Cook visited the Hawaiian Islands and returned in 1779. When his ship, Resolution broke a foremast as they were leaving, he was forced to turn back and return to Kealakekua Bay. A fight and theft of blacksmith tools led to a situation on shore where a Hawaiian canoe was confiscated, even after the tools were recovered. Tensions were high with the Hawaiian population and one of Cook's small boats was taken. In retaliation, Cook decided to kidnap King Kalaniʻōpuʻu. As he was being led away from his royal enclosure, his favorite wife, Kānekapōlei began to shout to the townspeople to get their attention. Two chiefs, Kalaimanokahoowaha (also known as Kanaina nui) and a royal attendant named Nuaa, saw her pleading as the King was being led away with his two sons following. As they reached the beach Kanaina, Kānekapōlei and Nuaa were able to convince Kalaniʻōpuʻu to stop and he sat where he stood. The crowd began to become aggressive and a rock was thrown and hit Cook. He took out his sword and struck Kanaina broadside without injury, but the chief reacted and immediately seized Cook and held him in his grip when the king's attendant, Nuaa stabbed him from behind. Before the remains of Cook were returned, the bones of the man were boiled down to strip off the flesh then given to chiefs. Kamehameha received Captain Cook's hair.

Kamehameha I, founder of the Kingdom of Hawaii

After Kalaniʻōpuʻu's death, Kīwalaʻō would take his father's place as first born and rule the island while Kamehameha would have religious authority. A number of chiefs supported Kamehameha and war soon broke out to overthrow Kīwalaʻō. After a number of battles the king was killed and envoys sent for the last two brothers to meet with Kamehameha. Keōua and Kaōleiokū arrived in separate canoes. Keōua came to shore first where a fight broke out and he and all aboard were killed. Before the same could happen to the second canoe, Kamehameha intervened. By 1795, Kamehameha would conquer all but one of the islands.

For his first royal residence, the new King built the first western-style structure built in the Hawaiian Islands, known as the "Brick Palace". The king commissioned the structure to be built at Keawa'iki point in Lahaina, Maui. Two foreign, ex-convicts from Australia's Botany Bay penal colony built the home. It was begun in 1798 and was completed after 4 years in 1802. The house was intended for Kaʻahumanu, but she refused to live in the structure and resided instead in a traditional Hawaiian-styled home only feet away.

Kamehameha I had many wives but held two the most high regard. Keōpūolani was the highest ranking aliʻi of her time and mother to his sons, Liholiho and Kauikeaouli. Kaʻahumanu was his favorite. Kamehameha I died in 1819 and his son, Liholiho would become the next king.

New king and form of government

Kamehameha II, and the new office of Kuhina Nui

After Kamehameha I's death, his first born son Liholiho left Kailua for a week and returned to be crowned king. At the lavish ceremony attended by commoners and nobles of the kingdom he approached the circle of chiefs, as Kaʻahumanu, the central figure in the group and Dowager Queen, spoke: "Hear me O Divine one, for I make known to you the will of your father. Behold these chiefs and the men of your father, and these your guns, and this your land, but you and I shall share the realm together" Liholiho agreed officially, which began a unique system of dual-government consisting of a King and co-ruler similar to a co-regent. The new Kamehameha II would share his rule with his stepmother, Kaʻahumanu. She would defy Hawaiian kapu by dining with the young king, violating the law separating genders during meals and leading to the destruction of the old Hawaiian religion. Kamehameha II died, along with his wife, Queen Kamāmalu in 1824 on a state visit to England where they succumbed to measles. He was King for only 5 years.

When Kamehameha II and his queen died in England, the remains of the couple were returned to Hawaii by Boki. On board the ship, "The Blond" his wife Liliha and Kekūanāoʻa would be baptized as Christians. Kaʻahumanu would also convert and become a heavy Christian influence on Hawaiian society until her death in 1832. Since the new king was only 12 years old, Kaʻahumanu was now senior ruler and named Boki as her Kuhina Nui.

Boki would leave Hawaii on a fatal trip to find sandlewood to cover a debt and would be lost at sea. His wife, Liliha would be left the governorship of Maui and would unsuccessfully attempt to whip up revolt against Kaʻahumanu, who, upon Boki's departure, had installed Kīnaʻu as a co-governor.

Kaʻahumanu

Kaʻahumanu was born on Maui around 1777. Her parents were aliʻi chiefs of a lower ranking line. She became Kamehameha's consort when she was fourteen. George Vancouver states: "[O]ne of the finest woman we had yet seen on any of the islands". To wed the young woman, Kamehameha had to consent to make Kaʻahumanu's children his heirs to the Kingdom although, in the end, she produced no issue.

Before his death, Kamehameha selected Kaʻahumanu to rule along with his son. Kaʻahumanu had also adopted the boy. She had the highest political clout in the islands. A portrait artist remarked of her: "This Old Dame is the most proud, unbending Lady in the whole island. As the widow of [Kamehameha], she possesses unbound authority and respect, not any of which she is inclined to lay aside on any occasion whatsoever". She is one of the most influential leaders in Hawaii's history.

Kamehameha III, Kaʻahumanu II, III, moi kuʻi, au-puni kuʻi and the Great Māhele

Liholiho's death elevated his younger brother, Kauikeaouli to the throne, styled as Kamehameha III at the age of twelve. When Kaʻahumanu died Kauikeaouli was 18.

With the death of the Kuhina Nui, the young king demanded to come into the possession of his full inheritance. He immediately rebelled against the Christian church and suspended all laws except murder and theft, which was a common tradition after the death of a chief. Distilleries were re-opened and the ban of alcohol lifted as was the ban on Hula. For his co-ruler, Kamehameha chose his aikāne (same sex partner), Kaomi. a young, half Tahitian man who had helped to heal the king and had been a close relationship for years. The church was outraged. Kaomi was granted true authority which he yielded. Eventually Kamehameha III, under pressure from the church, would remove the young man and would name Liliha to be the next Kuhina Nui. In November 1833, Hoapili (Liliha's father), Kekūanāoʻa, Kanaina and Kīnaʻu, along with armed royal attendants, including Kilinahe, went to the king's home to persuade him not to pick Liliha as Kuhina Nui. Hoapili begged the king to kill him if he should choose his daughter so the people would not blame him for her elevation. They pleaded with the king to choose Kinau as a true daughter of the House of Kamehameha. The King agreed and when he sent for Liliha to tell her the news, she was found drunk at home.

Kīnaʻu would be succeeded by Kekāuluohi as Kuhina Nui, acting for the true heir to the position, Victoria Kamāmalu, Kīnaʻu's infant daughter. Kekāuluohi would be styled as Kaʻahumanu III. After Kekāuluohi died in 1845, the next Kuhina Nui  would be Keoni Ana, the son of John Young, one of Kamehameha I's important foreign advisors. Kauikeaouli named an heir, his nephew, Alexander ʻIolani Liholiho who took the throne styled as Kamehameha IV in 1855. The third Kamehameha instituted the Great Mahele, which gave up millions of acres of land passed from his brother, who inherited it from Kamehameha I, leaving all to him as the ruler of the kingdom. Kamehameha III had illegitimate twin sons by Jane Lahilahi named Kīwalaʻō (died young) and Albert Kūnuiākea (1851–1903).

Kamehameha IV and Queen Emma
Alexander ʻIolani Liholiho was the nephew of Kamehameha II and grandson of Kamehameha I. He reigned as Kamehameha IV. Along with his wife Queen Emma, Kamehameha IV would establish the Queen's Medical Center. He was the son of Kīnaʻu, daughter of Kamehameha I and Kekūanāoʻa, a high ranking warrior chief from the conquest of the islands who became Governor of Oahu. He ascended the throne at the age of 21. He was a tall man often described as handsome.  His wife was, Emma Naea Rooke, granddaughter of John Young.  The couple had one child, a son named Albert Edward Kauikeaouli who died at the age of 4 years old leaving the throne to pass to his uncle.

Kamehameha V and the last Kamehameha king
Lot Kapuāiwa became king in 1863 styled as Kamehameha V. Lot was a bachelor up to his death in 1872 bringing to an end the Kamehameha Dynasty. However, Lot had an illegitimate daughter Keanolani by his classmate Abigail Maheha at the Chiefs' Children's School.

On his deathbed, before his passing, he offered the throne to Elizabeth Keka'aniau and Bernice Pauahi Bishop but they both refused it. Finally, Kamehameha V stated: "The throne belongs to Lunalilo; I will not appoint him, because I consider him unworthy of the position. The constitution, in case I make no nomination, provides for the election of the next King; let it be so." He would die the following morning. This enabled an election from the original stock of ali'i who were groomed for the position to rule by royal decree of King Kamehameha III.  The Princes and Chiefs of rank, eligible to be rulers who were groomed at the original Chiefs' Children's School.

Lunalilo
William Charles Lunalilo was the highest chief in the Hawaiian Kingdom of his time. He became the first elected monarch of the Hawaiian Kingdom and would be the last of the Kamehameha dynasty. Lunalilo was the son of Charles Kanaʻina and Miriam Auhea Kekauluohi, a niece of Kamehameha I through her father Kalaimamahu, Kamehameha I's half-brother. However, she was a formal member of the House of Kamehameha as a wife of the founding monarch in his last years. Lunalilo was also a member of the House of Keōua and the House of Moana. His mother was taken by Kamehameha, after her birth and given to Kaʻahumanu because she could not conceive. Kekauluohi was a punalua child, having dual parentage. Lunalilo was the last Kamehameha monarch.

Family tree

Legacy
The British name of the "Sandwich Islands" was replaced with "Hawaiʻi" due to the influence of the House of Kamehameha.

A good portion of the legacy of the Kamehamehas' lies in the lands and fortunes passed down to Bernice Pauahi Bishop. After her death in 1884, her husband, Charles Bishop, acting as one of five trustees and a co-executer of Pauahi's will, began the process of establishing the Kamehameha Schools which was founded in 1887. Charles Bishop would serve as president of the Board of trustees for the Bernice Pauahi Bishop Estate, a perpetual trust with Kamehameha Schools the sole beneficiary, and gave back to the estate all lands deeded to him during his life and helped fund the first structures of the school out of his own money. In 1889, the Bernice Pauahi Bishop Museum was founded and endowed by Charles Bishop as a repository for the priceless Hawaiian artifacts from Pauahi's family. Princess Ruth Ke'elikōlani was the daughter of Pauahi and Mataio Kekūanaō'a, and a governess of the Big Island of Hawai'i.

Notes

Citations

References
 
 
 
 
 
 
 
 

 
 
 

 
House of Līloa
Royalty of the Hawaiian Kingdom